Paillaco is a city and commune in southern Chile. It is located in Valdivia Province of Los Ríos Region, and is about 48 km southeast of  Valdivia.

Demographics
Of these, 9,973 (51.8%) lived in urban areas and 9,264 (48.2%) in rural areas. The population grew by 6% (1,085 persons) between the 1992 and 2002 censuses.

Administration
As a commune, Paillaco is a third-level administrative division of Chile administered by a municipal council, headed by an alcalde who is directly elected every four years. The 2008-2012 alcalde was Ramona Reyes. The council has the following members:
 José Teobaldo Aravena Pérez (PC)
 Ruth Lucy Castillo Prieto (PDC)
 Sergio Orlando Castro Barrera (RN)
 Héctor Alberto Avilés Fuentes (UDI)
 Gabriel Iván Medina Alarcón (PR)
 Gonzalo Rubén Galilea García (RN)

Within the electoral divisions of Chile, Paillaco is represented in the Chamber of Deputies by Enrique Jaramillo  (PDC) and Gastón Von Mühlenbrock (UDI) as part of the 54th electoral district, together with Panguipulli, Los Lagos, Futrono, Lago Ranco, Río Bueno and La Unión.

Education
Previously the area had a German school, Deutsche Schule Paillaco.

See also
Pichirropulli
Reumén

External links
  Municipality of Paillaco

References

Populated places in Valdivia Province
Communes of Chile